Vivancos is a surname. Notable people with the surname include:

 Albert Vivancos (born 1994), Spanish footballer
 Felipe Vivancos (born 1980), Spanish hurdler
 Miguel García Vivancos (1895–1972), Spanish painter and anarchist

See also
Vivanco